Hoseynabad-e Abdollah (also Romanized as Ḩoseynābād-e ʿAbdollah; also known as Ḩoseynābād) is a village in Mahmudabad-e Seyyed Rural District, in the Central District of Sirjan County, Kerman Province, Iran. At the 2006 census, its population was 335, in 80 families.

References 

Populated places in Sirjan County